The 2019 Special Olympics World Summer Games were a special olympics multi-sport event for athletes with intellectual disabilities  in the tradition of the Special Olympics movement. It was held in Abu Dhabi, United Arab Emirates from March 14–21, 2019.  ESPN offered international coverage of the games.

The 2019 Special Olympics World Summer Games was the first Special Olympics games to take place in the Middle East, were also the first to be held in winter/autumn in the host city  and the largest  sports and humanitarian event recorded, featuring 200 National Programs, more than 7,000 athletes and 20,000 registered volunteers. Since 2017 and following its national policy, the United Arab Emirates coined the term "determination" instead of "disability", referring to disabled people as "People of Determination".

Host selection 
Three finalists were chosen from the countries which had submitted bids to host the games: Australia, Germany (which was chosen latter to host the 2023 Games), and South Africa.  However, all three countries had withdrawn their bids by April 2015.

In November 2016,it was announced that the Emirate of Abu Dhabi would host the 2019 Summer Games. This was the first time that the Special Olympics were to be held in the Middle East / North Africa Region. Due to the region's extreme climate, the games were held during the local late winter/early spring season for the first time, from March 14–21, 2019.

Ceremonies

Opening ceremony

It was held at Zayed Sports City Stadium which also held the FIFA Club World Cup in 2017 and  2018 and the 2019 AFC Asian Cup.The headliners of the ceremonies included Avril Lavigne, Hussain Al Jassmi, Assala Nasri, Tamer Hosny, Paul Oakenfold, Sumi Jo, Now United, and Luis Fonsi.

Closing ceremony
The closing ceremony took place on 21 March 2019 at the Zayed Sports City Stadium where the Special Olympics flag was handed over from Abu Dhabi to Jämtland County, Sweden as the hosts of the 2021 Special Olympics World Winter Games. The headliners of the ceremonies were Nicole Scherzinger, Keala Settle, Now United, Hamad Al Ameri, Rashed Al Majed and Waleed Al Shami. Before the ceremonies the music video of the game's theme song "Right Where I'm Supposed To Be" by Ryan Tedder, Avril Lavigne, Luis Fonsi, Hussain Al Jassmi, Assala Nasri and Tamer Hosny was premiered.

Venues 
Events were held at nine venues across two emirates:

Abu Dhabi 

 Abu Dhabi National Exhibition Centre
 Abu Dhabi Sailing and Yacht Club
 Al Forsan Resort
 Corniche
 Yas Links Golf Club
 Yas Marina Circuit
 Zayed Sports City

Dubai 

 Dubai Police Club Stadium
 Hamdan Sports Complex

Sports

The following competitions took place:

Medals

Medal table

Nations

Participating nations

Marketing

Logo and branding

The logo was unveiled on March 25, 2017, during the handover at the closing ceremony of the 2017 Special Olympics World Winter Games in Graz, Austria. The logo was projected on the Burj Khalifa in Dubai.

Sponsors
Source:

Presenting Partner
 ADNOC

Official Partners

 ADNEC
 Aldar Properties
 Al Masaood LLC (Nissan)
 The Coca-Cola Company
 Abu Dhabi Department of Energy
 Emaar Properties
 Etihad Airways
 Etisalat
 First Abu Dhabi Bank
 Mubadala Development Company

Official Sponsors

 Emirates Foundation
 Lulu Hypermarket
 Meydan
 Nirvana Travel & Tourism
 NMC Health
 Noon
 SoftBank

Official Suppliers

 Abu Dhabi Global Market
 Careem
 CreatorUp!
 Crescent Petroleum
 Daman
 EF Education First
 Ernst & Young
 Essilor
 Golisano Foundation
 iWire
 KPMG
 Lions Clubs International
 Marriott International
 Perfect Sense
 Pierce Footwear
 Prometheus Medical
 Safilo Group
 SAS Institute
 Starkey Hearing Foundation
 Starkey Hearing Technologies
 Wicked

Official Supporters

 Al Sahraa
 CYVIZ
 Deloitte
 Dubai Airports Company
 Duracell
 Emirates Palace
 Falcon Drones
 Flow Solutions
 Hadef and Partners
  Techno Solutions
 Khateb and Alami
 Liberty Sport
 Riedel Communications
 SEDRA Foundation
 Seiko
 Salem Al Shueibi Jewelry
 Transportation Management Services
 SAP SE (Tyconz)
 Smart Design
 SmartKiosk
 Zayed Higher Organization for Humanitarian Care and Special Needs

Host, Broadcast, Media, Government and Venue Partners and Supporters

 Abu Dhabi Media
 Abu Dhabi Sailing & Yacht Club
 Abu Dhabi Sports Council
 Al Forsan International Sports Resort
 Al Roya
 Corniche (Abu Dhabi)
 Department of Culture and Tourism
 ESPN
 Hamdan Sports Complex
 Seha
 Sky News Arabia
 The National (Abu Dhabi)
 WWE
 Yas Links
 Yas Marina Circuit
 Zayed Sports City

References

External links
 Official website

 
Special Olympics World Summer Games
Special Olympics World Summer Games
2019 in Emirati sport
Multi-sport events in the United Arab Emirates
International sports competitions hosted by the United Arab Emirates
Sports competitions in Abu Dhabi